The following is a (partial) listing of vehicle model numbers or M-numbers assigned by the United States Army. Some of these designations are also used by other agencies, services, and nationalities, although these various end users usually assign their own nomenclature.

M1 to M99
for non sequential numbers, like M1 Abrams, see bottom of list.
 M1 Combat Car, also known as the M1 Light Tank
 M1 light motorcycle
 M2 Light tank, .5" MG or 37 mm gun, 11-ton
 M2 Medium Tank
 M2 Combat Car, (G38)
 M3 Medium tank (Lee/Grant), 28-ton, 37 mm and 75 mm gun
 M3 Light tank, (Stuart)12-ton, 
 M4 Medium tank (Sherman), 30-ton, 75/76 mm gun
 M5 Light tank, (Stuart)
 M6 Heavy tank, 60-ton
 M7 Medium tank (G137)
M8 Light Armored Car (Greyhound)
 M22 Locust Tank, light, airborne, 37 mm gun
 M24 Chaffee Tank, light, 18-ton, 75 mm gun
 M26 Pershing Tank, medium (originally classified as heavy), full-track, 47-ton, 90 mm
 M26E1 Pershing Tank, medium, full-track, 47-ton, 90 mm
 M26E2 Pershing Tank, medium, full-track, 48.5-ton, 90 mm
 M27 Medium tank, Detroit Arsenal
 M28 Cargo carrier (G154)
 M29 Weasel Carrier, cargo, full-track, 1/2-ton, amphibious (G179)
 M30 Cargo carrier (G158) based on M4 Sherman
 M31 Tank recovery vehicle (M3 Grant)
 M32 Recovery vehicle (M4 Sherman)
 M32A1 Recovery vehicle, medium, 16 inch full-track
 M32A1B1 Recovery vehicle, medium, 23 inch full-track (M4A1 chassis)
 M32A1B2 Recovery vehicle, medium, full-track
 M32A1B3 Recovery vehicle, medium, full-track
 M32B1 Recovery vehicle, medium, crane & a-frame, f-t, (M4A1 chassis)
 M32B2 Recovery vehicle, medium, 16 inch track, (M4A4 chassis)
 M33 Tank, prime mover, medium, full-track, 31-ton, (G222)
 M34 Tank, prime mover, medium, full-track, 31-ton, (M32B1 converted)
 M35 Tank, prime mover, turret removed, full-track, (M10A1 hull)
 M39 Armored Utility Vehicle, full-track, converted M18
 M41 Walker Bulldog Tank, light, 23.5-ton, 76 mm gun
 M41A1 Tank, combat, light, pintle mounted mg, full-track, 76 mm
 M41A2 Tank, combat, light, new turret traverse, full-track, 76 mm
 M41A3 Tank, combat, light, fuel injection engine, full-track, 76 mm
 M45 medium tank, (G226)
 M46 Patton tank, combat, medium, full-track, 90 mm, 48.5-ton
 M46A1 tank, combat, medium, slope side turret, full-track, 90 mm, 48.5-ton
 M46E1 tank, combat, medium, .30 cal mg fender kit, full-track, 90 mm
 M47 Patton tank, combat, M46 w/T42 turret, full-track, 90 mm, 48.5-ton
 M48 Patton tank, combat, full-tracked, 90 mm, 49-ton (1951)
 M48A1 tank, combat, gun stabilized in elevation and azimuth, 90 mm
 M48A1E1 tank, combat, full-track, British 105 mm (M48A1 chassis)
 M48A1E2 tank, combat, full-track, diesel engine, 90 mm
 M48A2 tank, combat, f-t, fuel injection engine, 90 mm, 50.75-ton (1956)
 M48A2C tank, combat, improved fire control, full-track, 90 mm
 M48A2E1 tank, combat, multi-fuel engine, full-track, 90 mm (1959)
 M48A3 tank, combat, production version of M48A1E2, 90 mm (1960)
 M48A4 tank, combat, f-t, M60 turret, 105 mm, (M48E3 chassis) (1965)
 M48C tank, mild steel, 'C' for condemned embossed into right front hull
 M48E1 tank, first with British gun, full-tracked, 105 mm
 M48E2 tank, prototype of M48A2
 M49 Otter, Carrier, cargo/troop, amphibious, full-tracked
 M51 Recovery vehicle, full-track, heavy, 60-ton, 30 mph, 200 mi range
 M59 armored personnel carrier, full-track, 20-ton, (1955)
 M59A1 carrier, armored personnel, machine gun cupola, f-t, 20-ton
 M60 main battle tank, full-tracked, 105 mm gun
 M60A1 tank, full-tracked, 105 mm gun (1968)
 M60A1E1 tank, combat, full-tracked, Zenon I/R, Shillelagh, new turret (1965)
 M60A1E2 tank, combat, full-tracked, stabilized Shillelagh, 152mm
 M60A1E3 tank, combat, full-tracked, experimental, 105 mm gun (1969)
 M60A1E4 tank, experimental, f-t, remote controlled 20 mm, 105mm
 M60A2 tank, full-tracked, remote controlled 20 mm, 152 mm Gun-Launcher (1970)
 M60A3 tank, combat, full-tracked, laser rangefinder, 900 hp engine, 105mm
 M60E1 tank, combat, full-tracked,British gun, 105mm
 M60E2 tank, combat, full-tracked, Shillelagh 152 mm, remote controlled 20m
 M66 tank, combat, full-tracked, Zenon I/R, Shillelagh 152 mm,
 M67 tank, combat, full-tracked, flamethrower, range 200 m (M48A1 chassis)
 M67A1 tank, combat, full-tracked, flamethrower, fuel capacity 378 gal (1961)
 M67A2 tank, combat, full-tracked, flamethrower (M48A3 chassis)
 M70 Reserved for German/American MBT-70
 M74 Tank Recovery Vehicle, medium, full tracked (M4A3E8 chassis) (1952)
 M75 (APC), medium, full-tracked
 M76 Otter Carrier, cargo, amphibious, full-tracked, 1-ton
 M84 Mortar Carrier, self-propelled, full-track, 4.2-inch, (1956)
 M85 Tractor, artillery towing, full-track, 23-ton
 M88, medium tank recovery, full-tracked, 55-ton, gasoline engine
 M88A1 recovery vehicle, improved, medium, full-tracked, 55-ton, diesel engine
 M88A2 recovery vehicle, improved, heavy, full-tracked, 70-ton, diesel

Pre-consecutive "Motor Carriages"
 M1 Mortar Motor Carriage 4.2 inch mortar on Cunningham T1E1 cargo carrier.
 M2 Mortar Motor Carriage (T5E1), (G79)
 M3 Gun Motor Carriage, (T12)
 M4 Mortar Motor Carriage, (T19)
 M5 Gun Motor Carriage, (T1), Cletrac
 M6 Gun Motor Carriage, (T21),
 M7 Howitzer Motor Carriage, (T32)
 M8 Howitzer Motor Carriage, (T17E1), Scott
 M9 Gun Motor Carriage, (T40),
 M10 Gun Motor Carriage, (T35E1),
 M11 not used
 M12 Gun Motor Carriage, (T6),
 M13 Multiple Gun Motor Carriage
 M14 Multiple Gun Motor Carriage
 M15 Multiple Gun Motor Carriage
 M16 Multiple Gun Motor Carriage
 M17 Multiple Gun Motor Carriage
 M18 Gun Motor Carriage, (T70)
 M19 Gun Motor Carriage,(T65E1)
 M20 ? Motor Carriage
 M21 Mortar Motor Carriage
 M22 ? Motor Carriage
 M23 ? Motor Carriage
 M24 ? Motor Carriage
 M25 ? Motor Carriage
 M26 ? Motor Carriage
 M27 ? Motor Carriage
 M28 ? Motor Carriage
 M29 ? Motor Carriage
 M30 ? Motor Carriage
 M31 ? Motor Carriage
 M32 ? Motor Carriage
 M33 ? Motor Carriage
 M34 Gun Motor Carriage 40 mm halftrack (T160)??
 M35 ? Motor Carriage
 M36 Gun Motor Carriage,(T71E1)
 M37 105 mm Howitzer Motor Carriage, (T76)
 M38 ? Motor Carriage (M38 Wolfhound, 37 mm, 6 × 6?)
 M39 ? Motor Carriage
 M40 Gun Motor Carriage
 M41 Howitzer Motor Carriage
 M42 Gun Motor Carriage (Duster)
 M43 Howitzer Motor Carriage
 M44 Self Propelled Howitzer (T99)
 M45 Self Propelled ?
 M46 Self Propelled ?
 M47 Self Propelled ?
 M48 Self Propelled ?
 M49 Self Propelled ?
 M50 Self Propelled Rifle(T165)(Ontos)
 M51 Self Propelled ?
 M52 Self Propelled Howitzer (T98)
 M53 Self Propelled Gun (T97)
 M54 Self Propelled ?
 M55 Self Propelled Howitzer
 M56 Self Propelled Gun(T101)
(Designation jumps to M100 series)

Armored Cars
 M1 Armored car (G29) Model T4 Cunningham (1934)
 M2 unknown
 M3 unknown
 M4 unknown
 M5 Armored car (G134) (T17 Deerhound)
 M6 Armored car (G122) (T17E1 Staghound)
 M7 Armored car (G133) (T18 Boarhound)
 M8 Armored car (G136) (Greyhound) T22
 (M9 halftrack car)?
 M10 redesignated M20 Armored Utility Car T26 (G176)
 M38 Wolfhound, 37 mm, 6 × 6

Scout cars
 M1 scout car (G31)
 M2 Scout car (G32)
 M3 Scout Car (G67)
 M4 Scout car (G66)

Half-tracks
 M1 car, Halftrack, (T1E1) 1933, Cadillac 8-cylinder, 115 HP. (33 produced)
 M2 half-track truck, (T9) (Ford)
 M2 half-track car, (T14) Autocar, White Motor Co.
 M3 half-track, Autocar, White Motor Co.
 M4 81 mm Mortar Carriage
 M5 half-track variant of M2 half-track car built by International Harvester
 M9 half-track car
 M15 half-track Multiple Gun Carriage built by Autocar
 M21 mortar carrier, 81mm

Pre-consecutive tractors
 M1 Light Tractor
 M1 Medium Tractor
 M1 Heavy Tractor
 M2 Light Tractor
 M2 Medium Tractor
 M2 Heavy Tractor

Tractor cranes
 M1 tractor crane, 1-ton, (G108)- International Harvester, T-6
 M2 unknown
 M3 tractor crane, 2-ton, (G69) - Caterpillar D6
 M4 tractor crane, 6-ton, (G126) - Caterpillar D7
 M5 tractor crane, 2-ton, (G99) - International Harvester T-9

High-speed
 M1 unknown
 M2 High Speed Tractor (G111)
 M3 unknown
 M4 Tractor, full-track, high-speed, 18-ton (G150)
 M4A1 Tractor, full-track, high-speed, 18-ton
 M4A1C Tractor, full-track, high-speed, 18-ton
 M4A2 Tractor, full-track, high-speed, 18-ton
 M4C Tractor, full-track, high-speed, 18-ton
 M5 Tractor, full-track, high-speed, 13-ton (G162)
 M5A1 Tractor, full-track, high-speed, 13-ton
 M5A2 Tractor, full-track, high-speed, 13-ton
 M5A3 Tractor, full-track, high-speed, 13-ton
 M5A4 Tractor, full-track, high-speed, 13-ton
 M6 Tractor, full-track, high-speed, 38-ton (G184)
 M7 Snow Tractor, search & rescue, half-track (G194) (Allis-Chalmers)
 M8 Tractor (G266)
 M8A1 Tractor, full-track, high-speed
 M8A2 Tractor, full-track, high-speed

Pre-consecutive trucks
 M1 AA prime mover (Corbitt), (GMC T95), 1931 (G28)
 M1 -ton, 4 × 2, Bomb service
 M1 1-ton, 4 × 2, Bomb service, (G85)
 M1 6-ton, 6 × 6, heavy wrecker, (G116)
 M1 artillery repair, COE, van, 1 to 3-ton, 4 × 4 (G82)
 M1 automotive repair, COE, van, 1 to 3-ton, 4 × 4 (G83)
 M1 Bomb service, (G85)
 M1 chemical service, GMC CCKW 2½-ton 6×6 truck
 M1 earth auger,
 M1 emergency repair (G61) – Dodge WC-41
 M1 light machine shop, (G16)
 M1 small arms repair, COE, van, 1 to 3-ton, 4 × 4 (G72)
 M1 spare parts, COE, van, 1 to 3-ton, 4 × 4 (G84)
 M1 tank maintenance, COE, van, 1 to 3-ton, 4 × 4 (G91)
 M1 heavy wrecking, (G63)
 M2 artillery repair, COE, van, 1 to 3-ton, 4 × 4 (G82)
 M2 automotive repair, COE, van, 1 to 3-ton, 4 × 4 (G83)
 M2 emergency repair (G61) – Dodge WC-60
 M2 spare parts, COE, van, 1 to 3-ton, 4 × 4 (G84)
 M2 tool and bench, COE, van, 1 to 3-ton, 4 × 4 (G58)
 M2 welding, COE, van, 1 to 3-ton, 4 × 4 (G59)
 M3 light machine shop, COE, van, 1 to 3-ton, 4 × 4 (G57)
 M3 welding, COE, van, 1 to 3-ton, 4 × 4 (G59)
 M4 machine shop, COE, van, 1 to 3-ton, 4 × 4 (G57)
 M5 unknown
 M6 1-ton, bomb service truck (G85)
 M7 small arms repair, GMC CCKW 2½-ton 6×6 truck
 M8 automotive repair, GMC CCKW 2½-ton 6×6 truck
 M9 artillery repair, GMC CCKW 2½-ton 6×6 truck
 M10 instrument repair, GMC CCKW 2½-ton 6×6 truck
 M11 not used
 M12 welding, GMC CCKW 2½-ton 6×6 truck
 M13 tool and bench, GMC CCKW 2½-ton 6×6 truck
 M14 spare parts, GMC CCKW 2½-ton 6×6 truck
 M15 unknown
 M16 machine shop, GMC CCKW 2½-ton 6×6 truck
 M17 unknown
 M18 electrical repair, GMC CCKW 2½-ton 6×6 truck
 M19 Tank Transporter (G159)
 M20 prime mover, 12-ton, Diamond T, (G159) – M19 Tank Transporter
 M21 unknown
 M22 lift, (G161)
 M23 Instrument bench, GMC CCKW 2½-ton 6×6 truck
 M24 unknown
 M25 Tank Transporter, tank transporter/recovery vehicle, nicknamed "Dragon Wagon". M26 tractor + M15 trailer. Used from 1944 to 1945
 M26 Tractor, 12-ton, armored cab. Component of the Dragon Wagon tank transporter
 M27 Bomb service, GMC CCKW 2½-ton 6×6 truck
 M28 unknown
 M29 unknown
 M30 signal corps repair, GMC CCKW 2½-ton 6×6 truck
 M31 signal corps repair, GMC CCKW 2½-ton 6×6 truck
 M32 tire repair, GMC CCKW 2½-ton 6×6 truck
 M33 unknown
 M34 Truck, Cargo, long wheelbase, 11.00×20", 6ea, 6 × 6 (M44 chassis) (G742) – M35 series 2½-ton 6x6 cargo truck
 M35 Truck, Cargo, 2-ton, 6 × 6, (G742) – M35 series 2½-ton 6x6 cargo truck
 M35A1 Truck, Cargo, 2-ton, 6 × 6
 M35A2 Truck, Cargo, 2-ton, 6 × 6
 M35A3 Truck, Cargo, 2-ton, 6 × 6
 M36 Truck, Cargo, 2-ton, 6 × 6, XLWB (G742) – M35 series 2½-ton 6x6 cargo truck
 M37 Truck, Cargo, -ton, 4 × 4 (G741) – Dodge M37
 M37B1 Truck, Cargo, -ton, 4 × 4 (G741)
 M38 Truck, -ton, 4 × 4, Utility, (G740) – Willys M38
 M39 Truck, Chassis, 5-ton, 6 × 6 (G744) – M39 series 5-ton 6×6 truck
 M40 Truck, Chassis, 5-ton, 6 × 6 (G744) – M39 series 5-ton 6×6 truck
 M41 Truck, Cargo, 5-ton, 6 x 6 (G744) – M39 series 5-ton 6×6 truck
 M42 Truck, Command, -ton, 4 × 4 (G741) – Dodge M37
 M43 Truck, Ambulance, -ton, 4 × 4 (G741) – Dodge M37
 M44 Truck, Chassis, 2-ton, 6 × 6 (G742) – M35 series 2½-ton 6x6 cargo truck
 M45 Truck, Chassis, 2-ton, 6 × 6 (G742) – M35 series 2½-ton 6x6 cargo truck
 M46C truck, Chassis, 2-ton, 6 × 6 (G742) – M35 series 2½-ton 6x6 cargo truck heating and tie down unit for Honest John
 M47 Truck, Dump Truck Chassis (G742) – M35 series 2½-ton 6x6 cargo truck
 M48 Truck, Tractor (G742) – M35 series 2½-ton 6x6 cargo truck
 M49 Truck, Tank, 6 × 6, Fuel Servicing (G742) – M35 series 2½-ton 6x6 cargo truck
 M49C Truck, Tank, 6 × 6, Fuel Servicing
 M49A1C Truck, Tank, 6 × 6, Fuel Servicing
 M49A2C Truck, Tank, 6 × 6, Fuel Servicing
 M50 Truck, Tank, 2-ton, 6 × 6, Water, 1,000 Gal (G742) – M35 series 2½-ton 6x6 cargo truck
 M51 Truck, Dump, 5-ton, 6 × 6 (G744) – M39 series 5-ton 6×6 truck
 M52 Truck, Tractor, 5-ton, 6 × 6 (G744) – M39 series 5-ton 6×6 truck
 M53 Chassis, Truck, -ton 4 × 4 (G741) – Dodge M37
 M54 Truck, Cargo, 5-ton, 6 × 6 (G744) – M39 series 5-ton 6×6 truck
 M55 Truck, Cargo, XLWB, 5-ton, 6 × 6 (G744) – M39 series 5-ton 6×6 truck
 M56 Chassis, Truck, -ton 4 × 4 (G741) – Dodge M37 (emergency repair)
 M56B1 Truck, Chassis, -ton, 4 × 4 (G741)
 M56C Truck, Chassis, -ton, 4 × 4 (G741)
 M57 Truck Chassis (G742) – M35 series 2½-ton 6x6 cargo truck
 M58 truck chassis (G742) – M35 series 2½-ton 6x6 cargo truck
 M59 Truck, Dump (G742) – M35 series 2½-ton 6x6 cargo truck
 M60 Truck, Wrecker, Light (G742) – M35 series 2½-ton 6x6 cargo truck
 M61 Truck, Chassis, 5-ton, 6 × 6 (G744) – M39 series 5-ton 6×6 truck
 M62 Truck, Wrecker, 5-ton, 6 × 6 (G744) – M39 series 5-ton 6×6 truck
 M63 Truck, Chassis, 5-ton, 6 × 6 (G744) – M39 series 5-ton 6×6 truck
 M64 Truck, Cargo Van, 5-ton, 6 × 6 (G744) – M39 series 5-ton 6×6 truck
 M65 unknown
 M66 unknown

Pre-consecutive trailers
 M1 Instrument trailer, (G26) for director or generator (3 inch AA)
 M1 searchlight trailer (G221)
 M1 chemical /bomb trailer 4-ton (G74)
 M2 Instrument trailer, (Director only), (3 inch AA)
 M2A1 Generator trailer, (Generator only), (3 inch AA)
 M2 chemical /bomb trailer 4-ton (G74)
 M3 Unknown
 M4 artillery plotting room trailer (G155)
 M5 Bomb Trailer, 2-ton, 3-wheel (G74)
 M6 tractor crane (G117)
 M7 2-ton generator trailer (G221)
 M8 armored ammunition, (G157)
 M9 Trailer, Tank, 45 Ton (Diamond T tank transporter) with integrated dolly (G159)
 M10 Trailer, Ammunition, 2-wheel (G660)
 M11 unknown
 M12 tractor crane
 M13 2-ton directors, soft top (G221)
 M14 2-ton directors, hard top (G221)
 M15 Semi-Trailer, Transporter, 40-Ton, 8-wheel – M25 Tank Transporter (G160)
 M15A2 Semi trailer, tank transport, 50-ton, 8-wheeled
 M16 clamshell bucket, for M2 crane (G201)
 M17 2-ton, quadmount (G221)
 M18 2-ton, generator, (G221)
 M19 snow trailer, 1-ton (G195)
 M20 quadmount (G220)
 M21 Trailer, Ammunition, 4-ton, 2-wheel (G213)
 M22 2-ton directors hard top (G221)
 M23 Trailer, Ammunition, 8-ton, 4-wheel (G216)
 M24 ammunition – Ben Hur trailer
 M25 tire repair – Ben Hur trailer
 M26 semitrailer, 7-ton (G713)
 M27 unknown
 M28 unknown
 M29 bomb trailer, 3/4-ton, 1-axle (G240)
 M30 Semitrailer, 6-ton Payload, 10-Ton Gross, 2-wheel, Fuel Tank, 2000-gallon (F2B Semitrailer, 2,000 Gal. Fuel Servicing, HeilCo) (G678)
 M31 unknown

Tankdozer kits
 M1 La Plante bulldozer for M4 Sherman (G228)
 M2 La Plante bulldozer for M4 Sherman (G228)
 M3 bulldozer for M46 Patton (G246)
 M4 bulldozer for M24 Chaffee (G265)
 M5 bulldozer for T8E4, and M8 high speed tractor
 M6 bulldozer for M47 Patton (G286)
 M7 unknown
 M8 bulldozer for M48 Patton (G278)
 M9 bulldozer for M60 (G306)

M100 to M199
 M100 Trailer, 2-Wheel, Cargo, -ton (G747, 1951)
 M101 Trailer, Cargo, -ton, 2-Wheel (G748)
 M101A1 Trailer, cargo, -ton, 2-wheeled
 M101A2 Trailer, cargo, -ton, 2-wheeled
 M101A3 Trailer, cargo, -ton, 2-wheeled
 M102 Chassis, Trailer, 1-ton, 2-Wheel (G754)
 M102A1 Chassis, Trailer, 1-ton, 2-wheeled
 M102A2 Chassis, Trailer, 1-ton, 2-wheeled
 M102 Vehicle, engineer armored, front mount crane, (M47 chassis), (1955)
 M103 Chassis, Trailer, 1-ton, 2-Wheel (G754)
 M103A1 Trailer, cargo, 2-wheeled
 M103A2 Trailer, generator, 60-cycle × 2, 2-wheeled
 M103 Tank, combat, full-track, 120 mm, 60-ton
 M103A1 Tank, combat, full-track, gun w/bore evacuator, 120 mm, 63-ton
 M103A1E1 Tank, experimental, f-t, M60 engine, transmission, fire control
 XM104 Self-Propelled Gun, combat, full-track, 105 mm, 4-ton, (1961)
 M104 Trailer, Cargo, 1-ton, 2-wheeled (M102 chassis) (G754)
 M104A1 Trailer, cargo, 1-ton, 2-wheeled
 M104A2 Trailer, cargo, 1-ton, 2-wheeled
 M105 Trailer, cargo, 1-ton, 2-wheeled (M102 chassis) (G754)
 M105A1 Trailer, cargo, 1-ton, 2-wheeled
 M105A2 Trailer, cargo, 1-ton, 2-wheeled
 M106 mortar carrier, self-propelled, full-track, 4.2-inch
 M106A1 mortar carrier, self-propelled, improved, diesel engine, f-t, 4.2-inch
 M106 Trailer, Tank: Water, 1-ton, 2-wheeled, 400 Gal (M102 chassis) (G754)
 M106A1 Trailer, Tank: Water, 1-ton, 2-wheeled, 400 Gal
 M106A2 Trailer, Tank: Water, 1-ton, 2-wheeled, 400 Gal
 M107 Field artillery, self-propelled, f-t, 175 mm, air-transportable
 M107E1 Field artillery, S-P, f-t, improved cooling, hydraulic, 175 mm
 M107 Trailer, Tank: Water, 1-ton, 2-wheeled, 400 Gal (M102 chassis) (G754)
 M107A1 Trailer, Tank: Water, 1-ton, 2-wheeled, 400 Gal
 M107A2 Trailer, Tank: Water, 1-ton, 2-wheeled, 400 Gal
 M108 Howitzer, self-propelled, light, 105 mm, range 15,000 m
 M108 Truck, Crane, 2-ton, 6 × 6 (G742) – M35 series 2½-ton 6x6 cargo truck
 M108 Truck, radio repair, 2-ton, 6 × 6
 M109 Howitzer, S-P, full-track, 155 mm, range 18,500 m, (1962)
 M109A1 Howitzer, self-propelled, medium, f-t, 8 ft longer barrel, 155 mm
 M109A2 Howitzer, self-propelled, medium, f-t, 8 ft longer barrel, 155 mm
 M109G Howitzer, S-P, horizontal sliding breech, (export to Switzerland)
 M109 Truck, Van, 6 × 6, Shop (G742) – M35 series 2½-ton 6x6 cargo truck
 M109 Truck, shop van, REO OA331 gas, 2-ton, 6 × 6
 M109A1 Truck, shop van, LDS-427 multifuel, 2-ton, 6 × 6
 M109A2 Truck, shop van, LDT-465 multifuel, 2-ton, 6 × 6
 M109A3 Truck, shop van, LDT-465, multifuel,2-ton, 6 × 6
 M110 Howitzer, S-P, heavy, f-t, 8-inch, nuclear ammo, (1961)
 M110E1 Howitzer, S-P, improved engine cooling, hydraulic, 8-inch
 M110E2 Howitzer, self-propelled, extended tube, 8-inch
 M113 Carrier, personnel, full-track, armored, 40 mph, range 300 mi
 M113A1 Carrier, personnel, diesel engine, full-track, armored, (1962)
 M113C Carrier, prototype, smaller version, remote controlled gun, 20 mm
 M113C+R Carrier, export, sold to Netherlands, (1965)
 M113C+R Carrier, export, sold to Canada, (1969)
 M113E1 Carrier, personnel, GE gas turbine engine, full-track, armored
 M113E2 Carrier, personnel, diesel engine, full-track, armored
 M113 (Lynx reconnaissance vehicle)
 M113 trailer, chassis, 3-ton, (G842) PGM-19 Jupiter
 M114 trailer, low bed, 3-ton, (G842) PGM-19 Jupiter
 M114 Carrier, command and reconnaissance, f-t, armored, air-droppable, (1962)
 M114A1 Carrier, command and reconnaissance, f-t, armored, side skirts eliminated, remote-controlled M2HB cupola, .50 cal
 M114A1 Carrier, reconnaissance, f-t, remote-controlled HS 120 gun, 20 mm, (1968)
 M114A1 Carrier, reconnaissance, f-t, new engine, transmission, torsion, (1973)
 M114A1E1 Carrier, reconnaissance, f-t, HS 820 gun, 20 mm, (1965)
 M114A2 Carrier, reconnaissance, f-t, modified gun cupola, 20 mm. (1965)
 M115 Trailer, Chassis, -ton, 2-Wheel (G747); chassis version of M100 trailer
 M116 Chassis: Trailer, -ton, 2-Wheel (G748); chassis version of M101 trailer photos m116 trailer.php
 M116 Carrier, cargo, f-t, soft skin, amphibious, Husky
 M116 Carrier, personnel, full-track, steel armor not aluminum
 M117 Chassis, Semitrailer, 6-ton, single axle (G751)
 M118 Semitrailer, Stake, 6-ton, single axle (M117 chassis) (G751)
 M118A1 Semitrailer, Stake, 6-ton, single axle
 M119 Semitrailer, Van, 6-ton, single axle, 2-Wheel (M117 chassis) (G751)
 M119A1 Semi trailer, van, 6-ton, 2-wheeled
 M123 Truck, Tractor, 10-ton, 6 × 6 (G792)
 M123A1 Truck, tractor, diesel, 10-ton, 6 × 6
 M123A1C Truck, tractor w/w 45,000 lb, Cummins V8 diesel, 10-ton, 6 × 6
 M124 Truck, radio repair shop, 2-ton, 6 × 6
 M125 Truck, Cargo, 10-ton, 6 × 6 (G792)
 M125 Carrier, self-propelled, full-track, mortar, 81 mm
 M125A1 Carrier, self-propelled, diesel engine, full-track, mortar, 81 mm
 M126 Chassis, Semitrailer, 12-ton, 4-Wheel (G750)
 M127 Semitrailer, Stake, 12-ton, 4-wheel (M126 chassis) (G750)
 M127A1 Semi trailer, cargo, 12-ton, 4-wheel
 M128 Semitrailer, Van, 12-ton, Cargo, 4-wheel (M126 chassis) (G750)
 M128A1 Semitrailer, Van, 12-ton, Cargo, 4-wheel
 M128A1C Semitrailer, Van, 12-ton, Cargo, 4-wheel
 M128A2C Semitrailer, Van, 12-ton, Cargo, 4-wheel
 M129 Semitrailer, Van, 12-ton, Cargo, 4-wheel (M126 chassis) (G750)
 M129A1 Semitrailer, Van, 12-ton, Cargo, 4-wheel
 M129A1C Semitrailer, Van, 12-ton, Cargo, 4-wheel
 M129A2C Semitrailer, Van, 12-ton, Cargo, 4-wheel
 M131A2 Semitrailer, Tank, Fuel Servicing, 5000 gal, 12-ton, 4-wheel (G755 & G888)
 M132 Truck, Medical Van (G742) – M35 series 2½-ton 6x6 cargo truck
 M132 Flame thrower, self-propelled, full-track, (M113 chassis)
 M132A1 Flame thrower, self-propelled, f-t, range 170 m, (M113A1 chassis)
 M132E1 Flame thrower, self-propelled, full-track, 11-ton
 M133 Truck, kitchen, 2-ton, 6 × 6, (Only made for Canadian Army. Kitchen Truck)
 M135 Truck, Cargo, 2-ton, 6 × 6 (G749)
 M139 Truck, Bridging, 5-ton, 6 x 6 (G744) – M39 series 5-ton 6×6 truck
 M139 Truck, Chassis, 5-ton, 6 x 6 (G744) – M39 series 5-ton 6×6 truck
 XM142 Truck, bomb handling, (G741) – Dodge M37
 M143A1 Trailer, bomb-transport, 2-ton, 4-wheeled
 M146C Semitrailer, Van, Shop, 6-ton, 2-Wheel (G824)
 XM147 Truck, amphibious, 2-ton, 6 × 6, "Super DUKW" (G814); based on M135
 XM148 Truck, amphibious, 5-ton, 6 × 6, "Gull" (ACF-Brill)
 M149 Trailer, Water, 400 gal, 2-wheeled (Water Buffalo) (G877)
 M149A1 Trailer, Water, 400 gal, 2-wheeled
 M149A2 Trailer, Water, 400 gal, 2-wheeled
 M151, jeep, utility, -ton, 4 × 4, 65 mph (G838)
 M151A1 Jeep, utility, -ton, 4 × 4, (1963)
 M151A1C Jeep, utility, -ton, 4 × 4, with M40A1 (Recoilless rifle, 106 mm)
 M151A2 Jeep, utility, -ton, 4 × 4, (1970)
 M152 Truck, panel, utility, -ton, 4 × 4, (Limited procurement by USAF. Radio/Command Truck), (G741) – Dodge M37
 XM157 Truck, amphibious, 8-ton, 8 × 8, "Drake", GMC
 M160 tank transporter, trailer, 60-ton, (G791)
 M162 Carrier, self-propelled, Vulcan gun, f-t, armored, (M113A1)
 M163 Carrier, self-propelled, Vulcan gun, f-t, armored, (M113)
 M164 semitrailer, office van, 6-ton, (G751)
 M170 Truck, Ambulance, Front Line, -ton, 4 × 4 (G758)
 M172 Semitrailer, Low Bed, 15-ton, 4-Wheel (G797)
 M172A1 Semitrailer, Low Bed, 25-ton, 4-wheel
 M173 tank transporter, trailer, 25-ton (G790)
 M179 self-propelled howitzer, 155mm,
 M185 Truck, Van, 2-ton, 6 × 6, Shop (G742) – M35 series 2½-ton 6x6 cargo truck
 M185A3 Truck, repair shop van, 2-ton, 6 × 6
 M190 Truck, cargo, 10-ton, 8 × 8, Sterling,
 M193 Truck, cargo, 15-ton, 8 × 8, Sterling
 M194 Truck, tractor, 15-ton, 8 × 8, Kenworth
 XM195 Truck, cargo, -ton, 4 × 4, (compact M37) – Dodge M37
 M195E1 Howitzer, self-propelled, full-track, 105 mm
 M197 Dolly, Trailer Converter, 6-ton, 2-Wheel (G800)
 M198 Dolly, Trailer Converter, 8-ton, 2-Wheel (G800)
 M199 Dolly, Trailer Converter, 18-ton (G811)

M200 to M299
 M200 Chassis: Trailer 2-ton, single axle (G756)
 M201 truck, telephone maintenance, -ton, Dodge M37
 M207 truck, chassis, 2-ton, 6 × 6, (G749)
 M209 truck, chassis, 2-ton, 6 × 6, (G749)
 M211 Truck, Cargo, 2-ton, 6 × 6, dual wheel (G749)
 M215 Truck, Dump, 2-ton, 6 × 6 (G749)
 M216 Truck, Gasoline Tank, 2-ton, 6 × 6
 M217 Truck, Gasoline Tank, 2-ton, 6 × 6 (G749)
 M217C Truck, tank, fuel serving, 2-ton, 6 × 6
 M220 Truck, Shop Van, 2-ton, 6 × 6 (G749)
 M220C Truck, shop van, 2-ton, 6 × 6
 M220D Truck, shop van, 2-ton, 6 × 6
 M221 Truck, Tractor, 2-ton, 6 × 6 (G749)
 M222 Truck, Water Tank, 2-ton, 1000 gal, 6 × 6 (G749)
 M238 truck, instrument repair shop, (G749)
 M242 trailer, M33 fire control, radar dish mount, 2-ton, (G789) Nike Ajax
 M243 trailer, M33 fire control, antina hauler, 2-ton, (G789) Nike Ajax
 M244 trailer, M33 fire control, computer van, 2-ton, (G789) Nike Ajax
 M246 Truck, Tractor, Wrecker, 5-ton, 6 × 6 (G744) – M39 series 5-ton 6×6 truck
 M246A1 Truck, tractor, wrecker, 5-ton, 6 × 6
 M246A2 Truck, tractor, wrecker, 5-ton, 6 × 6
 (Note for M247 Sergeant York see M988)
 M249 Truck, gun-lifting, heavy, (front), M65 Atomic Cannon
 M250 Truck, gun-lifting, heavy, (rear), (G268) M65 Atomic Cannon
 M254 truck, missile rocket motor, Nike Ajax
 M255 truck, body section, Nike Ajax
 M256 truck, inert, Nike Ajax
 M257 truck, inert, Nike Ajax
 M258A1 Trailer, radar-tracking van, 4-dual wheels (G789)
 M259A1 Trailer, Nike Hercules director station, 4-dual wheels (G789)
 M260 trailer, drop bed, antenna mount, Nike (G789)
 M261A1 Trailer, guided-missile flatbed, booster, 4-dual wheels (G789)
 M262 trailer, launch control van, (G789) Nike
 M268 Truck, propellant servicing, 5-ton, 6 × 6, Corporal II
 M269 Semitrailer, Low Bed, 12-ton, Wrecker, 4-wheel (G802)
 M270 Semitrailer, Low Bed, 12-ton, Wrecker, 4-wheel (G802)
 (for M270 launcher see M993)
 M271 trailer, pole transporter, 3-ton (K-36), (G782)
 M273 truck, 5-ton, 6 × 6,
 M274 Carrier, light weapons, Infantry, 4-cylinder Willys, -ton
 M274A1 Carrier, light weapons, Infantry, 106 mm platform, -ton, 25 mph
 M274A2 Truck, platform, utility, magnesium frame, -ton, 4 × 4
 M274A3 Truck, platform, utility, 2-cylinder 2AO42, M274 upgrade
 M274A4 Truck, platform, utility, 2-cylinder 2AO42, M274A1 upgrade
 M274A5 Truck, platform, utility, aluminum frame replacing magnesium, 4 × 4
 M275 Truck, Tractor, 2-ton, 6 × 6 (G742)- M35 series 2½-ton 6x6 cargo truck
 M275A1 Truck, Tractor, 2-ton, 6 × 6 (G742)
 M275A2 Truck, Tractor, 2-ton, 6 × 6 (G742)
 M278 semitrailer, water tank, 2000-Gal. (G817)
 M280 truck, servicing platform, (M39 truck) Corporal II
 M282 truck, cargo, 5-ton, 8 × 8, REO
 M283 Truck, cargo, export, LWB, -ton, 4 × 4, (LWB M37)
 M284 truck, fire control system, test shop, (G749)
 M289 Truck, Missile Launcher, 5-ton 6 x 6 (G744), Honest John (Note - for vehicle mounted rocket launchers see List of U.S. Army Rocket Launchers By Model Number)
 M291 Truck, Van, Expandable, 5-ton, 6 × 6 (G744) – M39 series 5-ton 6×6 truck
 M292 Truck, Van, 2-ton, Expansible (G742)- M35 series 2½-ton 6x6 cargo truck
 M292A1 Truck, van, extendable, 2-ton, 6 × 6
 M292A2 Truck, extendable, 2-ton, 6 × 6
 M295 Chassis, Semitrailer, 6-ton, 4-wheel (G819)
 M296 trailer, utility, 2-ton,

M300 to M399
 M301 truck, air compressor, Corporal missile
 M304 trailer, electronic shop, Nike Ajax
 M305 Bicycle, men's, (G519)
 M306 Bicycle, women's, (G519)
 M308 Semitrailer, tank, water, 1000 gal, 4-wheeled (G750)
 M310 Cable Reel Trailer, 3-ton (K-37B), 2-Wheel, 1955 (G813)
 M311 Trailer, warhead guided missile, 4-wheel. Corporal II
 M313 Semitrailer, Van, Expansible, 6-ton, two-axle, 4-wheel (G819)
 M323 Semi trailer, tracking station van, AN/MPQ-12, Corporal II
 M324 Trailer, Doppler station van, AN/MRQ-7, Corporal II
 M325 trailer, computer station van, AN/MSA-6, Corporal II
 M328 Truck, Bridging, 5-ton, 6 × 6, (G744) – M39 series 5-ton 6×6 truck
 M329 trailer, rocket transporter, (G821) Honest John
 M332 Trailer, Ammunition: -ton, 2-Wheel (G660)
 M342 Truck, Dump, 2-ton, 6 × 6, (M35A2 chassis) – M35 series 2½-ton 6×6 cargo truck
 M345 Flat Bed Trailer, 10-Ton, 2-Axle, 4-Wheel (G816)
 M346 semitrailer, tank transporter, 60-ton, 8-wheel, Dorsey
 M347 semitrailer, refrigerator, 15-ton, (G856)
 M348 Semitrailer, Van, Electronic, Tactical, 6-ton, 28-foot, 2-Wheel, (G833 & G848) V-189 trailer, for AN/MSC-25
 M349 Semitrailer, Van, Refrigerator, 7-ton, single-axle, 2-Wheel (G815 & G820)
 M350 truck, air servicer, Corporal II
 M353 Trailer, chassis, GP, 3-ton, 2-wheeled, NSN 2330-00-542-2831 (G854)
 M354 Dolly, Trailer Converter, 18-Ton, 4-Wheel (G872)
 M357 truck, cargo, 4-ton, 8 × 8, Teracruser, FWD
 M359 trailer, electronic shop van, 3-ton, (G789) Nike
 M363 Dolly, Trailer Converter, 7-ton
 M364 dolly, trailer converter, 6-ton,
 M365 Dolly, Trailer Converter, 10-ton (G676)
 M367 Trailer, Maintenance, Telephone Cable Splicer, -ton (K-38), 2-Wheel (G747) – Jeep trailer
 M373 Semitrailer, Van, Electronic, Tactical, 6-ton, 30-Foot, 4-Wheel (G833 & G878)
 M375 truck, tractor, 25-ton, 8 × 8, REO
 M376 truck, tractor, 25-ton, 8 × 8, Detroit Arsenal
 M377 truck, tractor, 25-ton, 8 × 8, Detroit Arsenal
 M381 truck, cargo, 2-ton, 4 × 4, (G742)
 M382 trailer, electronic shop van, (G789) Nike
 M383 trailer, electronic shop van, (G789) Nike
 M384 truck, cargo, 1-ton, 8 × 8, (G838)
 M386 Truck, Missile Launcher, 5-ton, 6 x 6, Honest John – M39 series 5-ton 6×6 truck
 M387 Truck, Guided Missile Launcher, 2-ton 6 x 6 (based on M44), MGM-18 Lacrosse
 M388 Semi trailer, tank, 3,000 gal, 2-wheeled, alcohol, PGM-11 Redstone
 M389 Trailer, w/missile test body kit, 1-ton, 2-wheeled, (G840)
 M390C Trailer, chassis, 2-ton, 2-wheeled, (G839)
 M394 semitrailer, medical van, 3-ton, (G833)
 M398 Truck, Guided Missile Launcher, 2-ton 6 x 6 (based on M45), MGM-18 Lacrosse

M400 to M499
 M401 variant of FWD teracruser also M357
 M405 handling unit trailer Honest John
 M406 antenna trailer Nike
 M408 truck, -ton, 6 × 6
 M409 truck, 10-ton, 8 × 8
 XM410 truck, 2-ton, 8 x 8, Chrysler
 M411 truck shop van MGM-18 Lacrosse
 M412 truck shop van MGM-18 Lacrosse
 M416 trailer, cargo, -ton, 2-wheeled (G857) (1962)
 M416A1 Trailer, cargo, -ton, 2-wheeled, (1976)
 M416B1 Trailer, cargo, -ton, 2-wheeled
 M417 trailer, cargo, 1-ton (G875)
 M420 trailer, MGR-3 Little John rocket
 M422 'Mighty Mite' Truck, utility, lightweight, -ton, 4 × 4 (G843) (1959)
 M422A1 'Mighty Mite' Truck, utility, lightweight, -ton, 4 × 4, (1960), 6 inch longer
 M423 ambulance, 1-ton 4 × 2, (G731)
 M424 trailer van, directors station (G789) Nike
 M425 truck, 5-ton, tractor, 4 x 2 (G671)
 M426 truck, 5-ton, tractor, 4 x 2 (G671)
 M427 truck, cargo, 2-ton, 18-foot, GMC, AFKWX-353
 M428 trailer van, radar tracking station, Nike
 M429 dolly, for Nike trailers
 M430 dolly, trailer, rear, for Nike trailers
 M431 dolly, trailer, front, for Nike trailers
 M432 dolly, trailer, rear, for Nike trailers
 M434 truck, cargo, 3-ton, 6 × 6
 XM437 truck, cargo, 15-ton Le Tourneau-Westinghouse (G860) – M520 Goer
 XM438 truck, fuel tanker, 5000-Gal, Le Tourneau-Westinghouse (G860) – M520 Goer
 M442 truck, guided missile, rocket motor, Nike Hercules
 M443 truck, cargo, -ton, 4 × 4, Willys mule
 M447 Semitrailer, Van, Shop, Folding Sides, 4-Wheel (G819)
 M447C Semitrailer, Van, Shop, Folding Sides, 4-Wheel
 M448 Trailer, Shop Van (M103A3 chassis) (G754)
 M451 truck, guided missile test set, Nike Hercules
 XM453E1 truck, cargo, 5-ton, 8 × 8, GMC
 XM453E2 truck, cargo, 5-ton, 8 × 8, Ford
 XM453E3 truck, cargo, 5-ton, 8 × 8, REO
 M454 trailer, chassis (G849)
 M455 trailer, low bed, 5-ton, (G842) PGM-19 Jupiter
 M456 trailer, chassis, 5-ton (G842) PGM-19 Jupiter
 M457 semitrailer, maintenance, weapon mechanical unit (G751)
 M458 semitrailer, maintenance, weapon electrical unit (G751)
 M459 semitrailer, maintenance, weapon connecting unit (G751)
 M460 trailer van, electronic, 5-ton (G842) PGM-19 Jupiter
 M461 trailer van, electronic, 3-ton (G842) PGM-19 Jupiter
 M463 trailer air conditioned, 1-ton (G871)
 M465 cart assembly, transport, 762mm rocket, Honest John
 M472 truck, van, missile firing data computer (G742) PGM-11 Redstone
 M473 truck, guided missile body section Nike Hercules
 M474 tracked carrier, guided missile equipment, Pershing 1 (G294)
 M477 truck, pneumatic shop, missile system, PGM-11 Redstone
 M478 truck, erector, guided missile, PGM-11 Redstone
 M479 trailer, missile battery shop, PGM-11 Redstone
 M480 trailer, missile body aft section, PGM-11 Redstone
 M481 semitrailer, missile warhead, PGM-11 Redstone
 M482 semitrailer, missile thrust unit, PGM-11 Redstone
 M483 trailer, air servicer, PGM-11 Redstone
 M484 semitrailer, supply office, PGM-11 Redstone
 M486 truck, missile repair parts, PGM-11 Redstone
 M487 trailer, missile repair parts, PGM-11 Redstone
 M488 truck, missile repair parts, PGM-11 Redstone
 M489 truck, missile nose section, Nike Hercules
 M499 semitrailer, van

M500 to M599
 M501 loader transporter, Hawk missile
 M503 truck, shop van, MGM-18 Lacrosse
 M504 semitrailer, launch station, MGM-29 Sergeant
 M506 truck, hydrogen peroxide servicer, PGM-11 Redstone – Dodge M37
 M508 semitrailer, shop van, 6-ton, (G751)
 M512 Truck, shop van, 2-ton, 6 × 6 (G742)
 M513 truck, shop van, MGM-18 Lacrosse
 M514 Trailer, chassis, 1-ton, 2-wheeled, (G839)
 M515 truck, shop van, MGM-18 Lacrosse
 M518 trailer, transporter, (G842)
 M520 'Goer', Truck, Cargo, 8-ton, 4 × 4, articulated (G861)
 M520E1 Carrier, Cargo, Full-Track, 8-ton
 M521A1 Howitzer, self-propelled, full-track, air transportable, 105 mm
 M523E2 Truck, tractor, 25-ton (G868)
 M524 semitrailer, 55-ton, 8-wheel (G869)
 M527 semitrailer, low bed, 6-ton (G859)
 M528 dolly, load divider, 35-ton (G870)
 M529 trailer, low bed, 7-ton, missile, Nike (G858)
 M530 truck, fire, 6 × 6, (Kaiser jeep)
 M531 truck, amphibious, -ton, 4 × 4, AMC, muskrat
 M532 trailer, field laundry,
 M533 trailer Bakery oven, 2-ton
 M535 truck, shop van, (G508)
 M536 trailer, laundry, 1-ton, (G867)
 M537 trailer, bakery, 2-ton, (G867)
 M538 trailer, dough mixer, (G867)
 M539 trailer, chassis, 6-ton, (G859)
 M543 Truck, Wrecker, medium, 5-ton, 6 × 6, Gas Engine (G744) – M39 series 5-ton 6×6 truck
 M543A1 Truck, Wrecker, medium, 5-ton, 6 × 6, Mack Engine
 M543A2 Truck, Wrecker, medium, 5-ton, 6 × 6, Continental Engine
 XM545 trailer, chassis, 1-ton 2 wheel (G839)
 M546 carrier tracked, guided missile, MIM-46 Mauler
 M548 Carrier, Cargo, Full-Tracked, amphibious, 6-ton, (M113 power train)
 M548A1 Carrier, Cargo, Full-Tracked, 6-ton, (M113 power train)
 M548E1 Recovery vehicle, with welder kit, full-track, 6-ton, (1968)
 M549 quad trac, Michigan Equipment
 M551 'Sheridan' Armored Airborne Reconnaissance Assault Vehicle, f-t, 152 mm gun or Shillelagh, (entered US service 1969)
 M553 'Goer', Truck, Wrecker, 10-ton, 4 × 4, articulated, W/W (G861)
 M553E1 Truck, wrecker, 10-ton, 6 × 6
 XM554 Truck, wrecker, 20-ton, 4 × 4, Le Tourneau-Westinghouse (G860)
 M555 semitrailer electronics van, 6-ton, 1-axle
 M556 semitrailer electronics shop van, 6-ton, 1-axle
 M557 semitrailer electronics van, 10-ton, 2-axle
 M558 semitrailer electronics van, 10-ton, 2-axle
 M559 'Goer', Truck, Fuel Servicing, 2500 gal., 4 × 4, articulated (G861)
 M561 'Gama Goat' Truck, Cargo, 1-ton, 6 × 6 (G874)
 M564 trailer van, electronic shop, 9-ton (G789)
 M565 dolly, trailer, front, for M564 van
 M566 dolly, trailer, rear, for M564 van
 M567 truck van, electronic shop, 2-ton, (G742)
 M569 trailer, chassis, -ton, (G857)
 M571 carrier, utility, F-T, articulated, (G879), Canadair, Dynatrac
 M572 rocket handler, with M36 truck
 M573 dolly, front, launch control station, (G789) Nike
 XM574 Semitrailer, Van: Electronic, 10-ton, 2 axle, 4 wheel (G883)
 M577 Carrier, command post, light, full-track
 M578 Light Recovery Vehicle
 M580 trailer, chassis, 1-ton, (G881)
 M581 trailer, chassis, 1-ton, (G881)
 M582 trailer, van, 2-ton, (G789)
 M583 trailer, van, 2-ton, (G789)
 M584 dolly, trailer, front, (G789)
 M585 trailer, cargo, -ton,
 M586 semitrailer, water tank, 2,000-Gal. (G882)
 M589 dolly, trailer, front, electronic, (G789)
 M595 dolly, trailer, front, antenna, (G789)
 M598 tracked cargo carrier, (G295)

M600 to M699
 M600 Dolly, trailer, electric shop, rear
 M601 Truck, Power Wagon, US/CANADA air force use, 1-ton, 4 × 4 (G834)
 M602 Truck, cargo, 2-ton, 6 × 6; modified M35
 M603 Truck, -ton, utility 4 × 4 (G847)
 M604 Truck, cargo, -ton (G845)
 M605 Truck, cargo 2-ton (G846)
 M606 Truck, utility, -ton, 4 × 4, modified CJ3B, (G395)
 M606A2 Truck, utility, -ton, 4 × 4, modified CJ5
 M606A3 Truck, utility, radio, auxiliary 24v power supply, -ton, 4 × 4
 M607 Truck, tractor, 2-ton, (G835)
 M608 Truck, dump, 2-ton (G835)
 M609 Truck, shop van, 2-ton (G835)
 M610 Truck, water tank, 1000 Gal. 2-ton (G835)
 M611 Truck, gasoline tanker, 1,200-Gal (G835)
 M612 Truck, van expansible (G835)
 M613 Truck, instrument repair shop (G835)
 M614 Truck, dump (G835)
 M615 Truck, Ambulance, 1-ton, 4 × 4 (G834)
 M616 Truck, chassis, 2-ton, 6 × 6, (G835)
 M617 Truck, chassis, 2-ton, 6 × 6, (G835)
 M618 Truck, chassis, 2-ton, 6 × 6, (G835)
 M619 Truck, chassis, 2-ton, 6 × 6, (G835)
 M620 Truck, chassis, 2-ton, 6 × 6, (G835)
 M621 Truck, cargo, export to Norway, 2-ton, 6 × 6, 11:00 × 20 (G900) – M35 series 2½-ton 6x6 cargo truck
 M622 Truck, fuel tank, export to Norway, engine flame heater kit, 6 × 6 (G900)
 M623 Truck, van, export to Norway, compressed air diff-lock on 3 axles (G900)
 M624 Truck, dump, export to Norway, (details apply to all 4 trucks) (G900)
 M625 trailer, water tank, 400-Gal. (G877)
 M626 truck, tractor 10-ton, (G792)
 M627 semitrailer, tank transporter, jointed, 52-ton, (G902)
 XM654 Semitrailer, Van: Telemetry Equipment, 10-ton, 2-axle, 4-wheel (G883)
 M656 Truck, cargo, 5-ton, 8 × 8, Ford (G852)
 M657 trailer, van radar simulator test station, (G789) Nike
 M667 Launcher-transporter, Lance Guided Missile, f-t, armor, (1964) MGM-52 Lance
 M671 semitrailer, van, maintenance, 6-ton (G859)
 M672 semitrailer, van, maintenance, 6-ton (G859)
 M674 Semitrailer, low-bed, 15-ton, 4-wheel (G884) Nike system
 M676 truck, cargo, pickup, Kaiser Jeep – FSN 2320-889-2004
 M677 truck, cargo, pickup, 4-door, Kaiser Jeep – FSN 2320-889-2005
 M678 truck, carry all, Kaiser Jeep – FSN 2320-889-2006
 M679 truck, ambulance, Kaiser Jeep – FSN 2320-889-2007
 XM680 Semitrailer, Van: Electronic Equipment, 10-ton, 2-axle, 4-wheel (G883)
 M681 semitrailer, van, 15-ton, 4-wheel
 M682 semitrailer, van, transmittal radar, 15-ton, 4-wheel, (G884)
 M683 semitrailer, van, control radar, 15-ton, 4-wheel, (G884)
 M684 semitrailer, van, heat exchanger, 15-ton, 4-wheel, (G884)
 M688 loader transporter, MGM-52 Lance
 M689 Dolly Set, Lift, Transportable Shelter (G889); includes M690 and M691
 M690 Dolly, trailer, front
 M691 Dolly, trailer, rear
 M696 tracked recovery vehicle, light, (M548 chassis)
 M699 dolly trailer, rear, (G789) Nike

M700 to M799
 M701 Mechanized infantry combat vehicle, Pacific Car and Foundry
 M705 truck, cargo, 1-ton, (G905), Chevrolet
 M706 Car, armored, light, (V-100 Cadillac Gage Commando)
 M707 dolly, set transportable shelter
 XM708 truck, dump, -ton (G741) – Dodge M37
 M709 trailer, stake/platform, -ton
 M710 scooter, rough terrain
 XM711 truck, wrecker, -ton, (G741) – Dodge M37
 M712 trailer, aircraft loading, 3-ton
 M713 motor scooter,
 M714 tractor, flat bed, tilt loading, 6-ton
 M715 Truck, cargo, troops, 1-ton, 4 × 4 (G890)
 M716 Trailer, Maintenance: Telephone Cable Splicer, -ton (G857)
 M718 Truck, ambulance, front-line, 1/4-ton, 4 × 4
 M718A1 Truck, ambulance, front-line, -ton, (1970)
 M720 Dolly Set, Lift, Transportable Shelter: 3-Ton (G898); includes M721, M722
 M721 dolly, front
 M722 dolly, rear
 M723 mechanized infantry combat vehicle, (FMC)
 M724 Truck, Cab and chassis, 1-ton, 4 × 4, (G890)
 M725 Truck, Ambulance, 1-ton, 4 × 4, w/o winch (G890)
 M726 Truck, Maintenance, 1-ton, NSN 2320-921-6379, w/winch (G890)
 M727 carrier, guided missile, Hawk missile
 M728 Combat Engineer Vehicle
 M729 tank, combat assault vehicle, (M116 Husky)
 M730 Carrier, self-propelled, guided missile, MIM-72 Chaparral, Sidewinder × 4
 M732 Carrier, self-propelled, Vulcan gun, f-t, armor, (M113A1 chassis)
 M733 carrier, cargo, amphibious, f-t, (M116 Husky)
 M734 mechanized infantry combat vehicle, (FMC)
 M737 truck, ambulance, 1-ton, Chevrolet (G905)
 XM738 Semitrailer, Van: Telephone Equipment, 6-ton, 4-Wheel (G883)
 XM739 Semitrailer, Van: Switchboard Equipment, 6-ton, 4-Wheel (G883)
 M740 trailer, missile launcher, MGM-52 Lance
 M741 carrier, M163 VADS
 M742 armored recovery vehicle, (MBT-70)
 M743 Armored vehicle-launched bridge, (MBT-70)
 M745 combat engineer vehicle, (MBT-70)
 M746 Truck, Tractor, Heavy Equipment Transporter (HET), 22-ton, 8 × 8 (G903) – HETT
 M747 Semi-Trailer, Low Bed, Heavy Equipment Transporter, 60-ton (G904) – HETT 
 M748 Truck, Bolster (or Logging), 5-ton, 6 × 6 (G744) – M39 series 5-ton 6×6 truck
 M749 semitrailer, shop van, 6-ton, (G819)
 M750 Semitrailer, Van, Repair Parts Storage, 6-ton, 4-Wheel (G819)
 M751A2 truck, bolster, 2-ton, 6 × 6
 M752 carrier, missile launcher, MGM-52 Lance
 M753 motor scooter, rough terrain
 M754 carrier, missile launcher, Hawk missile
 M755 Carrier, 81-mm Mortar: (M116 Husky)
 M756 truck, Maintenance, 2-ton, 6 × 6, Pipeline Construction, with winch (G742)- M35 series 2½-ton 6x6 cargo truck
 M756A2 truck, Maintenance, 2-ton, 6 × 6, Pipeline Construction, with winch (multifuel)- M35 series 2½-ton 6x6 cargo truck
 M757 truck, tractor, 5-ton, 8 × 8, (G852)
 M759 carrier, cargo, 1-ton, f-t (G353)
 M761 truck, cargo, 2-ton, 6 × 6, U.S. Steel
 M762 Trailer, chassis, -ton, 2-wheeled, (1970)
 M763 truck, Maintenance, Telephone (G742)- M35 series 2½-ton 6x6 cargo truck
 M764 truck, Maintenance, 2-ton, 6 × 6, Earthboring Machine & Pole Sitter with Winch (G742)- M35 series 2½-ton 6x6 cargo truck
 M765 mechanized infantry combat vehicle, (FMC)
 M766 truck, chassis, 2-ton, 6 × 6 (G901)
 M767 truck, chassis, 2-ton, 6 × 6, (G901)
 M768 truck, chassis, 2-ton, 6 × 6, (G901)
 M769 truck, chassis, 2-ton, 6 × 6, (G901)
 M770 truck, cargo, 2-ton, 6 × 6, (G901)
 M771 truck, cargo, 2-ton, 6 × 6, (G901)
 M772 truck, cargo, 2-ton, 6 × 6, (G901)
 M773 truck, cargo, 2-ton, 6 × 6, (G901)
 M774 truck, cargo, 2-ton, 6 × 6, (G901)
 M775 truck, cargo, 2-ton, 6 × 6, (G901)
 M776 truck, tanker, 2-ton, 6 × 6, (G901)
 M777 truck, chassis, 2-ton, 6 × 6, (G901)
 M778 truck, cargo, dropside, 2-ton, 6 × 6, (G901)
 M779 truck, fuel tanker, 2-ton, 6 × 6, (G901)
 M780 truck, water tanker, 1000-Gal. 2-ton, 6 × 6, (G901)
 M781 truck, shop van, 2-ton, 6 × 6, (G901)
 M782 truck, instrument repair shop, 2-ton, 6 × 6, (G901)
 M783 truck, tractor, 2-ton, 6 × 6, (G901)
 M784 truck, dump, 2-ton, 6 × 6, (G901)
 M785 truck, bolster, 2-ton, 6 × 6, (G901)
 M786 truck, pole derrick, 2-ton, 6 × 6, (G901)
 M787 truck, telephone maintenance, 2-ton, 6 × 6, (G901)
 M788 truck, auger, 2-ton, 6 × 6, (G901)
 M789 trailer, flat bed tilt loading, -ton (G907)
 M790 Trailer Erector Launcher Guided Missile, Pershing 1a
 M791 Truck, Expandable Van, 5-ton, 8 × 8 (G852)
 M792 Truck, Ambulance, 1-ton, 4 × 4 (G874) – M561 Gama Goat
 M793 semitrailer, tank transporter, jointed, 52.5-ton, HETT
 M794 trailer, field laundry, 4-ton,
 M795 trailer, dough mixer, 4-ton,
 M796 trailer, bolster, 4-ton (G882)
 M798 Trailer, Bolster

M800 to M899
 XM800 Armored Reconnaissance Scout Vehicle, (Lockheed-6 × 6.), (FMC-tracked)
 M802 Trailer, electric shop, radar course direct central, Nike Hercules
 M803 tank combat, 152mm gun,
 M805 Dolly set, (used by M802)
 M806 tank recovery vehicle, (M113 chassis)
 M807 tank recovery vehicle, (M113 chassis)
 M808 combat vehicle, articulated, Twister, Lockheed
 M809 Truck, Chassis: 5-ton, 6 × 6 LWB, AM General (G908) – M809 series 5-ton 6x6 truck
 M810 Truck, Chassis: 5-ton, 6 × 6 SWB (G908) – M809 series 5-ton 6x6 truck
 M811 Truck, Chassis: 5-ton, 6 × 6 XLWB (G908) – M809 series 5-ton 6x6 truck 
 M812 Truck, Chassis: 5-ton, 6 × 6 XLWB (G908) – M809 series 5-ton 6x6 truck
 M813 Truck, Cargo: 5-ton, 6 x 6 LWB (G908) – M809 series 5-ton 6x6 truck
 M813A1 Truck, Cargo Dropside, 5-ton, 6 × 6 (G908) – M809 series 5-ton 6x6 truck
 M814 Truck, Cargo: 5-ton, 6 × 6, XLWB (G908) – M809 series 5-ton 6x6 truck
 M815 Truck, Bolster: 5-ton, 6 × 6 (G908) – M809 series 5-ton 6x6 truck
 M816 Truck, Wrecker: 5-ton, 6 × 6, Cummins 250 Engine (G908)
 M817 Truck, Dump: 5-ton, 6 × 6 (G908) – M809 series 5-ton 6x6 truck
 M818 Truck, Tractor: 5-ton, 6 × 6 (G908) – M809 series 5-ton 6x6 truck
 M819 Truck, Tractor: 5-ton, 6 × 6, Wrecker (G908) – M809 series 5-ton 6x6 truck
 M820 Truck, Van: 5-ton, 6 × 6, Expansible (G908) – M809 series 5-ton 6x6 truck 
 M821 Truck, Stake: Bridge Transporter, 5-ton, 6 × 6 (G908) – M809 series 5-ton 6x6 truck
 XM822 Semitrailer, Van: Petroleum Testing Laborator, 10-Ton, 4-Wheel
 XM823 Semitrailer, Van: Teletype Equipment, 10-Ton, 4-Wheel (G883)
 XM824 Semitrailer, Van: Cryptographic Equipment, 10-Ton, 4-Wheel (G883)
 M825 Truck, recoilless rifle, 106 mm, -ton, 4 × 4, (1970)
 M829 dolly set (G889); includes M830 and M831
 M830 dolly set, front
 M831 dolly set, rear
 M832 Dolly Set, Lift, Transportable Shelter: 5-Ton
 M840 Dolly Set, Lift, Transportable Shelter: 4-Ton
 XM844 Semitrailer, Van: On-Line Electronic Equipment, 10-Ton, 4-Wheel
 XM845 Semitrailer, Van: Off-Line Electronic Equipment, 10-Ton, 4-Wheel
 XM847 Semitrailer, Van: Digital Terminal No. 1 Equipment, 10-Ton, 4-Wheel
 XM848 Semitrailer, Van: Digital Terminal No. 2 Equipment, 10-Ton, 4-Wheel
 XM849 Semitrailer, Van: Secure Voice-Dlectronic Equipment, 10-Ton, 4-Wheel
 XM850 Semitrailer, Van: Voice Switch Equipment, 10-Ton, 4-Wheel
 M857 Semitrailer, tank, fuel, 5,000 gal, 4-wheel
 M860 semitrailer, flat bed, radar set, and M901 launcher MIM-104 Patriot
 M869 semitrailer, launcher, MIM-104 Patriot
 M870 Semitrailer, Low Bed, 40-ton
 M871 Semitrailer, Tactical, Dual Purpose Breakbulk / Container Transporter, 22-Ton
 M872 Semitrailer, Tactical, Dual Purpose Breakbulk / Container Transporter, 34 Ton; extended M870
 M876 telephone truck, auger/derrick
 M877 'Goer', Truck, Cargo, 8-ton, 4 × 4, articulated, with crane
 M878 Truck, Tractor, 5-ton, 4 × 2, Yard Type
 M880/M890 Pickups, (1976) (Early CUCV)
 M880 – 4×4 pickup
 M881 – M880 fitted with additional 100-amp 24-volt generator
 M882 – M881 fitted with additional 60-amp 24-volt generator and communications equipment
 M883 – M881 fitted with slide-in shelter kit
 M884 – M880 fitted with 100-amp 24-volt generator and slide-in shelter kit with tie-downs
 M885 – M880 fitted with slide-in shelter kit with tie-downs
 M886 – M880 ambulance model
 M887 – M880 maintenance model
 M888 – M880 telephone maintenance model
 M890 – 4 × 2 pickup
 M891 – M890 fitted with additional 60-amp 24-volt generator
 M892 – M890 fitted with additional 60-amp 24-volt generator and communications kit
 M893 – M890 ambulance version

M900 to M999
 M901 ITV Vehicle, Improved TOW, Full Track
 M911 Truck, Tractor, Commercial, Heavy Equipment Transporter (C-HET), 22-ton, 8 x 6 – HETT
 XM912 Semitrailer, Van: Computer Equipment, 10-Ton, 4-Wheel
 XM913 Semitrailer, Van: Computer Equipment, 10-Ton, 4-Wheel
 M915 Truck, Tractor, Line Haul, 14-ton, 6 × 4 – M915 (truck)
 M916 Truck, Tractor, Light Equipment Transporter (LET), 6 × 6 w/winch – M915 (truck)
 M917 Truck Chassis, 8 × 6 (for 20-ton dump truck) – M915 (truck)
 M918 Truck Chassis, 6 × 6 (for 1500 gal bituminous distributor) – M915 (truck)
 M919 Truck Chassis, 8 × 6 (for concrete mobile mixer) – M915 (truck)
 M920 Truck, Tractor, Medium Equipment Transporter (MET), 20-ton, 8 × 6 w/winch – M915 (truck)
 M923 Truck, Cargo: 5-ton, 6 × 6 Dropside - M939 series 5-ton 6x6 truck
 M924 Truck, Cargo: LWB, 5-ton, 6 × 6 (w/o winch) - M939 series 5-ton 6x6 truck
 M925 Truck, Cargo: 5-ton, 6 × 6 Dropside (w/winch) - M939 series 5-ton 6x6 truck
 M926 Truck, cargo, longbed, 5-ton, 6 × 6  - M939 series 5-ton 6x6 truck
 M927 Truck, Cargo: 5-ton, 6 × 6 XLWB- M939 series 5-ton 6x6 truck
 M928 Truck, Cargo: 5-ton, 6 × 6 XLWB (w/winch) - M939 series 5-ton 6x6 truck
 M929 Truck, Dump: 5-ton, 6 × 6 - M939 series 5-ton 6x6 truck
 M930 Truck, Dump: 5-ton, 6 × 6 (w/winch) - M939 series 5-ton 6x6 truck
 M931 Truck, Tractor: 5-ton, 6 × 6 - M939 series 5-ton 6x6 truck 
 M932 Truck, Tractor: 5-ton, 6 × 6 (w/winch) - M939 series 5-ton 6x6 truck
 M933 Truck, Tractor: 5-ton, 6 × 6 (w/winch) - M939 series 5-ton 6x6 truck
 M934 Truck, Van, Expansible: 5-ton, 6 × 6 XLWB - M939 series 5-ton 6x6 truck
 M935 Truck, Van, Expansible: 5-ton, 6 × 6 XLWB, w/hydraulic lift gate - M939 series 5-ton 6x6 truck
 M936 Truck, Medium Wrecker: 5-ton, 6 × 6 (w/winch) - M939 series 5-ton 6x6 truck
 M939 Truck, Chassis: 5-ton, 6 × 6 (w/winch)
 M940 Truck, Chassis: 5-ton, 6 × 6 (w/winch) - M939 series 5-ton 6x6 truck
 M941 Truck, Chassis: 5-ton, 6 × 6 - M939 series 5-ton 6x6 truck
 M942 Truck, Chassis: 5-ton, 6 × 6 (XLWB) - M939 series 5-ton 6x6 truck
 M943 Truck, Chassis: 5-ton, 6 × 6 (XLWB W/winch) - M939 series 5-ton 6x6 truck
 M944 Truck, Chassis: 5-ton, 6 × 6 - M939 series 5-ton 6x6 truck
 M944A1 truck, chassis, 5-ton, 6 × 6 Mobile shop equipped
 M945 Truck, Chassis: 5-ton, 6 × 6 - M939 series 5-ton 6x6 truck
 M963 truck, cargo, 2-ton, 6 × 6,
 M966A1 Truck, missile carrier, TOW, armor, 1-ton, 4 × 4, w/o winch (HMMWV)
 M967 Semitrailer, Tank, Bulk Haul, 5000 Gal., Self Load/Unload
 M969 Semitrailer, Tank, Fuel Dispensing, 5000 Gal. Automotive
 M970 Semitrailer, Tank, Fuel Dispensing, 5000 Gal. Under/Over Wing Aircraft
 XM971 Semitrailer, Van: Satellite Terminal, 10-Ton, 4-Wheel
 M972 semitrailer, tanker, water, 5.000-Gal.
 M973 carrier, cargo, f-t, (SUSV)
 M974 semitrailer, low bed, 12-ton, MIM-104 Patriot
 M975 carrier, launcher, f-t,
 M976 semitrailer, missile transport, MIM-104 Patriot
 M977 Truck, Cargo: 10-ton, 8 × 8, with Materiel Handling Crane – HEMTT
 M978 Truck, Tank: 10-ton, 8 × 8, Fuel Servicing, 2500 gallon – HEMTT
 M981 FISTV Carrier, Infantry, armored, full-track, (M113 chassis)
 M983 Truck, Tractor: 10-ton, 8 × 8 – HEMTT
 M984 Truck, Wrecker: 10-ton, Recovery, 8 × 8  – HEMTT
 M984A1 HEMTT Truck, Wrecker, 10-ton, 8 × 8, Recovery
 M984E1 HEMTT Truck, Wrecker, 10-ton, 8 × 8, Recovery
 M985 Truck, Cargo: 10-ton, 8 × 8, with HD Materiel Handling Crane – HEMTT
 M985W1 HEMTT Truck, Cargo, 10-ton, 8 × 8, with HD Materiel Handling Crane
 M986 semitrailer, transporter, erector/launcher, Ground Launched Cruise Missile
 M987 fighting vehicle system carrier
 M988 chassis, self-propelled, (M48A5), M247 Sergeant York
 M989 Heavy Expanded Mobility Ammunition Trailer (HEMAT), 11-ton
 M990 semitrailer, van, 6-ton,
 XM991 Semitrailer, Van: Repair Facility, 10 ton, 2 axle, 4 wheel
 M992 carrier, ammunition, (FAASV), (M109A2 chassis)
 M993 M270 Multiple Launch Rocket System
 XM995 Semitrailer, Van: Test Station, 10 ton, 2 axle, 4 wheel
 M996 truck, ambulance, 4 × 4, armored, 2-litter,(HMMWV)
 M997 Truck, ambulance, 4-litter, armor, 1-ton, 4 × 4 (HMMWV)
 M997A1 Truck, ambulance, 4-litter, armor, 1-ton, 4 × 4 (HMMWV)
 M998 Truck, cargo, personnel, 1-ton, 4 × 4, w/o winch (HMMWV)
 M998A1 Truck, cargo, personnel, 1-ton, 4 × 4, w/o winch (HMMWV)

M1000 to M1099
 M1000 Semitrailer, Low Bed, 70-ton, Rear Loading – HETT
 M1001 Truck, Tractor, 10-Ton, 8 × 8, MAN (w/crane)
 M1002 Truck, Wrecker, 10-Ton, 8 × 8, MAN w/crane
 M1005 semitrailer,electronic, 6-ton, 1-axle Roland missile
 M1006 Semitrailer, Van, Electronic NBC, 6 Ton
 M1007 semitrailer, van, electronic, 6-ton Pershing II
 M1008 Truck, cargo, 1-ton, 4 × 4, NSN 2320-01-123-6827
 M1008A1 Truck, cargo, communications kit, 100amp/24v, 1-ton, 4 × 4 (CUCV)
 M1009 Truck, utility, -ton, 4 × 4, NSN 2320-01-123-2665 (CUCV)
 M1010 Truck, ambulance, 1-ton, 4 × 4, NSN 2320-01-123-2666 (CUCV)
 M1013 truck, tractor, 10-ton, 8 × 8, MAN (w/crane)
 M1014 truck, tractor, 10-ton, 8 × 8, MAN (w/o crane), NSN 2320-12-191-5425
 M1015 carrier, cargo, f-t, ballistic protected shelter
 M1022 Dolly Set, Lift, Transportable Shelter: 7-Ton
 M1025A1 Truck, armament carrier, armor, 1-ton, 4 × 4, w/o winch (HMMWV)
 M1026A1 Truck, armament carrier, armor, 1-ton, 4 × 4, w/winch (HMMWV)
 M1028 Truck, shelter carrier, 1-ton, 4 × 4, NSN 2320-01-123-5077 CUCV
 M1028A1 Truck, shelter carrier, 1-ton, 4 × 4, PTO capability
 M1028A2 Truck, shelter carrier, 1-ton, 4 × 4, PTO, dual rear wheels
 M1028A3 Truck, shelter carrier, 1-ton, 4 × 4, dual rear wheels
 M1028FF Truck, firefighting, 1-ton, 4 × 4, dual rear wheels
 M1030M1 Motorcycle
 M1031 Truck, chassis, 1-ton, 4 × 4, PTO capability (contact truck) CUCV
 M1032 Semitrailer van guided missile repair parts: (PATRIOT)
 M1034 trailer, flatbed, 5-ton
 M1035A1 Truck, ambulance, 2-litter, soft-top, 1-ton, 4 × 4 (HMMWV)
 M1036 truck, Truck, missile carrier, TOW, supplemental armor, 4 × 4, w/winch (HMMWV)
 M1037 truck, shelter carrier, 4 × 4, (S-250 shelter)
 M1038A1 Truck, cargo, personnel, 1-ton, 4 × 4, w/o winch (HMMWV)
 M1040 Fast Attack Vehicle, 4 × 2
 M1041 Fast Attack Vehicle, 4 × 2, w/TOW
 M1042 truck, shelter carrier, 4 × 4, w/winch, (S-250 shelter)
 M1043A1 Truck, armament carrier, supplemental armor, 4 × 4, w/o winch (HMMWV)
 M1044A1 Truck, armament carrier, supplemental armor, 4 × 4, w/winch (HMMWV)
 M1045A1 Truck, missile carrier, TOW, supplemental armor, 4 × 4, w/o winch (HMMWV)
 M1046A1 Truck, missile carrier, TOW, supplemental armor, 4 × 4, w/winch (HMMWV)
 M1047 armored car, 8 × 8, LAV-25
 M1048 trailer, flatbed, 6-ton
 M1050 carrier, ammunition, FAASV
 M1059 carrier, smoke generator, (M113 chassis)
 M1060 remote engineer vehicle, ROBAT (modified M60 tank)
 M1061 Trailer, flatbed, 5 ton, 4 × 4, XM1061A1
 M1062 Semitrailer, Tank: Fuel, 7500 Gal., 2-Axle
 XM1063 Semitrailer, Van: Electronic Tactical, 12-Ton, 4-Wheel
 M1064 mortar carrier, equipped with M121 120 mm mortar
 M1065 carrier, command post, f-t, 1.5-ton (M973 series)
 M1066 carrier, ambulance, f-t, 1.5-ton (M973 series)
 M1067 carrier, cargo, f-t, 1.5-ton (M973 series)
 M1069 truck, tractor, prime mover, light artillery,(M119 105mm)
 M1070 tractor, 8 × 8, HETT
 M1073 trailer, flat bed, general purpose, 7.5-ton
 M1074 Truck, Palletized Loading, 10 × 10 with Material Handling Crane and 20K winch – Palletized Load System
 M1075 Truck, Palletized Loading, 10 x 10 w/o Material Handling Crane – Palletized Load System
 M1076 Palletized Load System Trailer (PLST) – Palletized Load System 
 M1077 truck, flatrack, Palletized load system, (PLST)
 M1078 2.5-ton Cargo Truck, (LMTV)
 M1079 2.5-ton Van
 M1080 2.5-ton Chassis
 M1081 2.5-ton Cargo Truck LVAD LAPES/AD
 M1082 2.5-ton Trailer
 M1083 5-ton Cargo Truck
 M1084 5-ton Cargo Truck with MHE
 M1085 5-ton Long-wheelbase Cargo Truck
 M1086 5-ton Long-wheelbase Cargo Truck with MHE
 M1087 5-ton Expansible Van
 M1088 5-ton Tractor
 M1089 5-ton Wrecker
 M1090 5-ton Dump Truck
 M1091 5-ton Fuel Truck
 M1092 Truck, Chassis 5-ton
 M1093 5-ton Cargo Truck LVAD LAPES/AD
 M1094 5-ton Dump Truck LVAD LAPES/AD
 M1095 5-ton Trailer
 M1096 5-ton Long-wheelbase Chassis
 M1097A1 Truck, HMMWV, variant, heavy, 1-ton, 4 × 4
 M1097A2 Truck, HMMWV, maintenance, heavy, 1-ton, 4 × 4
 M1097 Avenger, short-range air defense system
 M1098 5000 gallon semitrailer

M1100 to M1199
 M1100 trailer, for M120 120 mm mortar
 M1101 trailer, cargo, light, (for HMMWV)
 M1102 trailer, cargo, heavy, (for HMMWV)
 M1103 trailer, chassis, (for HMMWV)
 M1108 Universal Carrier, armoured carrier based on the M113
 M1109 HMMWV 4 × 4 weapon carrier
 M1112 Trailer, Tank, Water: 400 gallon, 1-ton, 8-wheel (Water Buffalo)
 M1113 HMMWV 4 × 4 utility vehicle
 M1114 HMMWV 4 × 4 weapon carrier with improved armour protection
 M1115 HMMWV 4 × 4 self-propelled TOW missile launcher
 M1116 4 × 4 armoured security vehicle
 M1117 Armored Security Vehicle, Guardian, 4 × 4 armoured security vehicle based on the V-100 Commando,
 M1120 HEMTT Load Handling System (LHS)
 M1121 HMMWV 4 × 4 self-propelled TOW missile launcher
 M1123 HMMWV 4 × 4 utility vehicle,
 M1124
 M1125
 M1126 ICV version of the Stryker
 M1127 RV version of the Stryker
 M1128 MGS version of the Stryker
 M1129 MC version of the Stryker
 M1130 CV version of the Stryker
 M1131 FSV version of the Stryker
 M1132 ESV version of the Stryker
 M1133 MEV version of the Stryker
 M1134 ATGM version of the Stryker
 M1135 NBCRV version of the Stryker
 M1136
 M1137
 M1138
 M1139
 M1140 FMTV 5-Ton truck version for the HIMARS launcher system
 M1141
 M1142 HEMTT Tactical Fire Fighting Truck based on the (M1120)
 M1143
 M1144
 M1145 HMMWV version for USAF FAC duties
 M1146
 M1147 FMTV Load Handling System Trailer
 XM1148 FMTV 8.8-Ton load handling system truck
 M1149
 M1150 Assault breacher vehicle based on the M1 Abrams
 M1151 Up-Armored Capable HMMWV Enhanced Armament Carrier 
 M1152 Up-Armored Capable HMMWV Enhanced Troop/Cargo/Shelter Carrier 
 M1153
 M1154
 M1155
 M1156
 M1157 FMTV 10-Ton dump truck 
 M1158 HEMTT water tender version of the (M1120)
 M1159
 M1160 FMTV 10-Ton truck variant for MEADS system
 M1161 Growler (vehicle) light support vehicle, 
 M1162 Growler (vehicle) trailer, canceled
 M1163 Growler (vehicle) light support vehicle, Prime mover, 
 M1164 ammunition trailer
 M1165 Up-Armored HMMWV
 M1166
 M1167 TOW HMMWV
 M1168
 M1169
 M1170
 M1171
 M1172
 M1173
 M1174
 M1175
 M1176
 M1177
 M1178
 M1179
 M1180
 M1181
 M1182
 M1183
 M1184
 M1185
 M1186
 M1187
 M1188
 M1189
 M1190
 M1191
 M1192
 M1193
 M1194
 M1195
 M1196
 M1197 HMMWV Field Litter Ambulance (Air Force)
 M1198
 M1199

M1200 to M1299
 M1200 Armored Knight
 M1201 FCSMGV RSV
 M1202 FCSMGV MCS
 M1203 FCSMGV NLOS-C
 M1204 FCSMGV NLOS-M
 M1205 FCSMGV RMV
 M1206 FCSMGV ICV
 M1207 FCSMGV ME-V
 M1208 FCSMGV ME-T
 M1209 FCSMGV C2V
 M1210
 M1211 ECV 2 Command and Control
 M1212 ECV 2 Armament Carrier
 M1213 ECV 2 Shelter/Troop Carrier
 M1214 ECV 2 TOW Weapons Carrier
 M1215
 M1216 Small Unmanned Ground Vehicle
 M1217 Multifunctional Utility/Logistics and Equipment
 M1218 Multifunctional Utility/Logistics and Equipment
 M1219 Armed Robotic Vehicle
 M1220 Caiman 6X6 MRAP MRPV
 M1221 RG-33L USMC 6X6 MRAP
 M1222
 M1223
 M1224 MaxxPro
 M1225 ECV 2 Ambulance
 M1226 RG-33L 6x6 MMPV Panther Mine Resistant Vehicle Engineer
 M1227 RG-33L 6X6 MMPV Panther Mine Resistant Vehicle EOD
 M1228
 M1229 RG-33L 6X6 MMPV Prophet Signals Intelligence vehicle
 M1230 Caiman TVS
 M1231 Husky VMMD
 M1232 RG-33L 6X6 MRAP
 M1233 RG-33L 6X6 Ambulance MRAP
 M1234 MaxxPro Plus MRAP
 M1235 MaxxPro Dash/Dash DXM MRAP
 M1236 RG-31A3 (EM) MRAP
 M1237 RG-33L Plus MRAP 6X6
 M1238 RG-33 SOCOM MRAP 4X4
 M1239 RG-33L SOCOM AUV 6X6
 M1240 M-ATV 
 M1241 RG-31 Mk5E MRAP
 M1242
 M1243
 M1244
 M1245 SOCOM M-ATV  SOCOM version of the M1240
 M1246
 M1247
 M1248 6X6 MTV Caiman
 M1249 Maxxpro 6X6  MaxxPro 6X6 recovery vehicle
 M1250 Tilt Deck Recovery Trailer (TDRT) 
 M1251 FSVV
 M1252 MCVV
 M1253 ATVV
 M1254 MEVV
 M1255 CVV
 M1256 ICVV
 M1257 ESVV
 M1258
 M1259
 M1260
 M1261
 M1262
 M1263
 M1264
 M1265
 M1266 MaxxPro Long Wheel Base (LWB) Ambulance
 M1267
 M1268 Light Engineer Utility Trailer (LEUT) Type I
 M1269 LEUT Type II
 M1270 RG-31 Mk5E Medium Mine Protected Vehicle (MMPV) Type II
 M1271 Hydrema 910 mine clearing vehicle
 M1272 Buffalo A2
 M1273 FMTV 10-ton chassis
 M1274 M-ATV Key Leader Vehicles (KLV), WIN-T Soldier Network Extension (SNE)
 M1275
 M1276 M-ATV Key Leader Vehicles (KLV), WIN-T Point of Presence (PoP)
 M1277 M-ATV fitted with M153 CROWS
 M1278 Joint Light Tactical Vehicle (JLTV) Heavy Guns Carrier (HGC)
 M1279 Joint Light Tactical Vehicle (JLTV) Utility (Utl)
 M1280 Joint Light Tactical Vehicle (JLTV) General Purpose (GP)
 M1281 Joint Light Tactical Vehicle (JLTV) Close Combat Weapons Carrier (CCWC)
 M1282
 M1283 General Purpose (GP)
 M1284 Medical Evacuation Vehicle (MEV)
 M1285 Medical Treatment Vehicle (MTV)
 M1286 Mission Command (MCmd)
 M1287 Mortar Carrier Vehicle (MCV)
 M1288 Ground Mobility Vehicle (GMV 1.1)
 M1289 Joint Light Tactical Vehicle (JLTV) Trailer 
 M1290
 M1291
 M1292
 M1293
 M1294
 M1295
 M1296 Dragoon (ICVD)
 M1297 Army Ground Mobility Vehicle (AGMV 1.1)
 M1298
 M1299 Extended Range Cannon Artillery

M1300 to M1399
 M1300 tractor, 8 × 8, EHETS
 M1301 Infantry Squad Vehicle (ISV)
 M1302 semi-trailer, tank transporter EHETS 8-axles, 85-ton

Non-consecutive numbers
 M1 Abrams Tank, main battle, full-track, 105 mm gun, 58-ton
 M1A1 Abrams Tank, main battle, full-track, 120 mm gun, 58-ton
 M1A2 Abrams Tank, main battle, full-track, 120 mm gun w/2nd gun sight for TC
 M2 Bradley Vehicle, Infantry Fighting, full-track, armored, 25 mm chain-gun, 21-ton
 M2A1 Vehicle, Infantry Fighting, full-track, armored, 25 mm chain-gun, 21-ton
 M2A2 Vehicle, Infantry Fighting, full-track, armored, 25 mm chain-gun, 21-ton
 M3 Bradley Vehicle, Cavalry Fighting, full-track, armored, 25 mm chain-gun, 21-ton
 M3A1 Vehicle, Cavalry Fighting, full-track, armored, 25 mm chain-gun, 21-ton
 M3A2 Vehicle, Cavalry Fighting, full-track, armored, 25 mm chain-gun, 21-ton
 M3 CROP Palletized Load System
 M4 C2V battlefield command post
 M5 Ground Based Common Sensor Carrier
 M6 Linebacker anti-aircraft vehicle
 M7 Bradley Fire Support Vehicle
 M8 Armored Gun System
 M9 ACE - Armored Combat Earthmover
 M93 Fox, armoured reconnaissance vehicle, 6 × 6
 M104 Wolverine (AVLB)
 M1975 Launcher, Heavy Dry Support Bridge
 M1977 HEMTT Common Bridge Transporter (CBT) – HEMTT
 XM2001 Crusader, self-propelled howitzer

See also

 List of armoured fighting vehicles
 List of land vehicles of the U.S. Armed Forces
 List of military vehicles
 List of U.S. military vehicles by supply catalog designation
 List of U.S. Signal Corps vehicles
 List of individual weapons of the U.S. Armed Forces
 Military technology and equipment
 United States Army Tank Automotive Research, Development and Engineering Center
 NATO Stock Number

References

 
 
 
 
 
 
 
 WD CAT. ORD 1 Introduction to Ordnance catalog
 WD CAT. ORD 2 Index to Ordnance supply catalog
 ST 9-159 Handbook of Ordnance material dated March 1968. (ST is Special Text)

External links
 WWII US Vehicle Markings (pdf)
 Combined Arms Research Library - scans of vehicle data sheets circa 1960

Lists of cars
Military trucks
Off-road vehicles
United States Army equipment
United States Army lists
Military vehicles of the United States
United States